Allanton is a village on the A71, in North Lanarkshire, Scotland.

Allanton Colliery was the last colliery to be built and the first colliery to be taken over by the National Coal Board in 1951.

Allanton Primary school was opened in 1927 and a nursery school added in 1999.

Places nearby include Hartwood (1.3 miles/2.1 km), Newmains (2.3 miles/3.7 km), Shotts (2.8 miles/4.5 km) and Wishaw (4.4 miles/7.1 km).

See also
List of places in North Lanarkshire

References

RLS Pathfinder Pack on the Coal Industry 1900 - 1950
 http://www.northlanarkshire.gov.uk/index.aspx?articleid=5751 Last accessed [10 March 2013]

External links

SCRAN image of Surface layout, Kingshill No.1 Colliery, Allanton, Lanarkshire
SCRAN image of Oblique aerial view of Loudounhill Sand and Gravel Pit, near Allanton, Lanarkshire
The Stuarts of Allanton
North Lanarkshire Council: Allanton Primary School and Nursery class
Wishaw Press, June 2010, "Allanton Primary School's eco week"

Villages in North Lanarkshire
Mining communities in Scotland